Maksym Volodymyrovych Kagal (1 December 1991 – 25 March 2022) was a Ukrainian athlete-kickboxer and a soldier.

Career 
Maskym Kagal was a world champion on the national team of Ukraine and bronze medalist in kickboxing according to ISKA 2014. He was a silver medalist of the open championship of Kremenchuk in rugby-7. Kagal was a bronze medalist in the K-1 section (weight category up to 60 kg).

Death 
He served in the Azov Battalion as a senior lieutenant under the call sign "Piston". On 25 March 2022, he was killed defending Mariupol from Russian forces. He was posthumously awarded Hero of Ukraine.

References

1991 births
2022 deaths
Ukrainian male kickboxers
People from Kremenchuk
Recipients of the title of Hero of Ukraine
Ukrainian military personnel killed in the 2022 Russian invasion of Ukraine
Ukrainian military personnel of the war in Donbas
Siege of Mariupol
Sportspeople from Poltava Oblast
21st-century Ukrainian people